Belle and Sebastian may refer to:

Belle and Sebastian (1965 TV series), the 1965 French live-action television series about a boy named Sébastien and his unusually intelligent dog Belle
 Belle et Sébastien, 1966 novel by Cécile Aubry inspired from the above TV series
 Belle and Sebastian (Japanese TV series), a 1981–1982 Japanese animated television series adaptation of the novel, also known as Meiken Jolie
 Belle and Sebastian (film), a 2013 French film adaptation of the novel
Belle and Sebastian: The Adventure Continues, the 2015 film sequel
Belle and Sebastien: Friends for Life, the 2017 final film sequel
 Belle and Sebastian: New Generation, 2022 reboot with altered plotline
Belle and Sebastian (2017 TV series), a 2017 Canadian-French animated television series adaptation of the novel
Belle and Sebastian, Scottish indie pop band formed in 1996 which took its name from the above French story
 "Belle and Sebastian", song by the band first appearing on the Dog on Wheels EP